The 1994 Mid-Eastern Athletic Conference men's basketball tournament took place March 8–11, 1994, at the Talmadge L. Hill Field House in Baltimore, Maryland. It was the first time in twenty years that Baltimore had hosted the MEAC men's tournament.  defeated , 87–70 in the championship game, to win its 14th MEAC Tournament title.

The Aggies earned an automatic bid to the 1994 NCAA tournament as No. 16 seed in the Midwest region. In the round of 64, North Carolina A&T fell to No. 1 seed and eventual National champion Arkansas 94–79.

Format
All nine conference members participated, with the top 7 teams receiving a bye to the quarterfinal round.

Bracket

* denotes overtime period

References

MEAC men's basketball tournament
1993–94 Mid-Eastern Athletic Conference men's basketball season
MEAC men's basketball tournament
Basketball competitions in Baltimore
College sports tournaments in Maryland